Útila Airport  is an airport serving Útila, Islas de la Bahía, Honduras. It handles regional and international air traffic for the town of Útila. The airport is served by several airlines on a daily schedule, as well as numerous private and charter flights.

Northeast approach and departure are over the water.

Airlines and destinations

Incidents and accidents
 On 10 May 2009, a BAe Jetstream 32 on an illegal flight  ran out of fuel and crashed short of the runway, killing one of the three occupants.
 On 4 April 1990, an Isleña Airlines De Havilland DHC-6 Twin Otter crashed into water 175 feet short of the runway threshold. There were minor injuries among the twenty passengers and crew. The crew were reportedly blinded by sunlight during the approach.
On 28 May 1980, a SAHSA Douglas C-47 suffered substantial damage after the extended gear hit a wall during approach, causing the aircraft to impact terrain.

See also

 Transport in Honduras
 List of airports in Honduras

References

External links
 
 OpenStreetMap - Útila
 OurAirports - Útila

Airports in Honduras